Zavoj Lake (Serbian: Завојско језеро, Zavojsko jezero) is an artificial lake in eastern Serbia, on the Visočica River. It was created in 1963 after a major landslide which dammed the river and the natural dam was later replaced with a hydroelectric dam "Zavoj".

Location 

Lake Zavoj is located in eastern Serbia, in the northern part of the Visok region, close to the Serbian-Bulgarian border. Lake is in the valley of the Visočica River which is both its major tributary and outflow, between the mountains of Stara Planina on the north and Vidlič on the south. Settlements in the vicinity of the lake, which is among the least populated in the entire Serbia, include Novi Zavoj, Velika Lukanja and Pakleštica.

History 

Reservoir was created behind the dam, flooding the village of Zavoj. This original natural lake was dried, the natural dam was consolidated and the artificial lake was recreated, this time as a reservoir for the hydroelectric power plant "Zavoj". The village of Novi Zavoj was built on the higher ground instead of the flooded old village of Zavoj.

Immediately after the dam was finished, Serbian government began a project of conducting waters from Temštica's upper course (Toplodolska reka) into the lake. Project was continued in the early 2000s but the local population in the watershed of Temštica protested claiming that over 80% of the water was already taken out of their river and that further catchment of the water from it would result in an ecological catastrophe, especially in the canyon of Temštica popularly called "Little Colorado". As a result of this, municipality of Pirot officially opposed the government's decision in 2004 and 2006, but the government insisted on continuing the project. In protest, population of the village of Temska boycotted the Serbian parliamentary elections in January 2007.

Paleontological site 

In the Upper Triassic, 230 to 200 million years ago, the area was a shallow, ending part of the large tropical sea, the Tethys Ocean. The mud and sediments petrified in the form of plates which are rich in remains of mollusk shells (which have been found on the slopes of the Stara Planina at over ), sea worms, snails and other marine animals (sea crocodiles, sharks, giant mollusks) with indications that fossils of the dinosaurs can be found also.

Gallery

See also 
 List of lakes in Serbia
 Visočica River

References

External links 

 Photos of Lake Zavoj

Zavoj
Triassic System of Europe
Landslide-dammed lakes
Pirot